Corrhenes paulla is a species of beetle in the family Cerambycidae. It was first described by Ernst Friedrich Germar in 1848 as Saperda paulla. It is known from Australia. The Australian Faunal Directory gives the accepted name for this species as Rhytiphora paulla.

Subspecies
 Corrhenes paulla fuscosignata Breuning, 1970
 Corrhenes paulla paulla (Germar, 1865)

References

Corrhenes
Beetles described in 1848